Kosiorowski (feminine: Kosiorowska; plural: Kosiorowscy) is a Polish surname. Notable people with this surname include:

 Piotr Kosiorowski (born 1981), Polish footballer
 Sebastian Kosiorowski (born 1990), Polish footballer

See also
 

Polish-language surnames